In enzymology, a 5'-acylphosphoadenosine hydrolase is an enzyme that catalyzes the chemical reaction

5'-acylphosphoadenosine + H2O  AMP + a carboxylate

Thus, the two substrates of this enzyme are 5'-acylphosphoadenosine and H2O, whereas its two products are AMP and carboxylate.

This enzyme belongs to the family of hydrolases, specifically those acting on acid anhydrides in phosphorus-containing anhydrides.  The systematic name of this enzyme class is 5'-acylphosphoadenosine acylhydrolase. This enzyme is also called 5-phosphoadenosine hydrolase.  This enzyme participates in purine metabolism.

References 

 

EC 3.6.1
Enzymes of unknown structure